Clostridium frigoris is a bacterium from the genus Clostridium.

References

 

Bacteria described in 2003
frigoris